Javier Frana defeated Todd Woodbridge 7–6(7–4), 6–3 in the final to secure the title.

Seeds

  Thomas Enqvist (second round)
  Jonas Björkman (first round)
  Mark Woodforde (semifinals)
  Alexander Volkov (quarterfinals)
  MaliVai Washington (second round)
  Patrick Rafter (second round)
  Todd Woodbridge (final)
  Marcelo Ríos (second round)

Draw

Finals

Section 1

Section 2

External links
 1995 Manchester Open Singles draw

Singles